Porshinev (Russian and Tajik: Поршинев), also called Porshnev, is a jamoat in eastern Tajikistan. It is located in Shughnon District in Gorno-Badakhshan Autonomous Region. The jamoat has a total population of 8,723 (2015). Its main village is Vahdat.

In the pre-Soviet period Porshinev was written in Persian as Porshinev (پارشنیو) or Porshinef (پارشنیف).

Notes

References

Populated places in Gorno-Badakhshan
Jamoats of Tajikistan